"Bronco Buster" or "bronco buster" may refer to:

the rodeo event Bronc riding
the professional wrestling move bronco buster (professional wrestling)
the 1952 film Bronco Buster (film)
the 1927 silent film The Bronco Buster (1927 film)
Bronco Buster (Denver, Colorado), a statue by sculptor Alex Phimister Proctor, in Denver's Civic Center Historic District

See also
The Bronco Buster, a statue by sculptor Frederick Remington